The Early Family Historic District is a cluster of five properties in Brandywine, Maryland associated with the Early family, leading developers and promoters of the community in the late 19th century.  It includes a store built in 1872, by William H. Early, who platted the township out, the William W. Early House, one of the finest Queen Anne Victorians in the county, and three other Early family residences.

The district was listed on the National Register of Historic Places in 2012.

See also
National Register of Historic Places listings in Prince George's County, Maryland

References

External links
, including undated photo, at Maryland Historical Trust website

Houses on the National Register of Historic Places in Maryland
Historic districts in Prince George's County, Maryland
National Register of Historic Places in Prince George's County, Maryland
Queen Anne architecture in Maryland
Colonial Revival architecture in Maryland
Historic districts on the National Register of Historic Places in Maryland